The Seventh Tunisia Plan was an economic development plan implemented by the government of Tunisia from 1986 to 1990.

See also
Economy of Tunisia
Third Tunisia Plan
Fourth Tunisia Plan
Sixth Tunisia Plan
Ninth Tunisia Plan

References

Economic history of Tunisia